Cara Black and Elena Likhovtseva were the defending champions, but lost in semifinals to tournament winners Elena Dementieva and Janette Husárová

Dementieva and Husárová defeated Daniela Hantuchová and Ai Sugiyama 6–2, 6–4 in the final.

Seeds

Draw

Draw

External links
 Main and qualifying rounds

Southern California Open
Acura Classic - Doubles